The Pee Dee Vipers are a professional basketball team playing in the Premier Basketball League. The Vipers will begin play in the 2014 PBL season.

History
The Vipers are the first professional basketball team to play in Florence since the Florence Flyers of the USBL played there in 2004. In their inaugural season, the Vipers will be coached by Larry Brown, a veteran high school and college coach.

References

External links
Official Website

Basketball teams in South Carolina
Former Premier Basketball League teams
2013 establishments in South Carolina
Basketball teams established in 2013
Florence, South Carolina